Sardar Masood Ali Khan Luni is a Pakistani politician who is member-elect of the Provincial Assembly of the Balochistan.

References

Living people
Year of birth missing (living people)